Rog is a 2005 Hindi film.

Rog or ROG may also refer to:

People
 Ronan O'Gara (born 1977), Irish rugby union coach and former player
 Rog Phillips, American science fiction writer Roger Phillips Graham (1909-1965)
 Michel Rog (born 1973), Dutch politician and trade union leader
 Marko Rog (born 1995), Croatian footballer

Places
 Rog, Albania, a village in Berat County
 Róg, Pomeranian Voivodeship, Poland, a settlement
 Róg, Warmian-Masurian Voivodeship, Poland, a village
 Rog, Kočevje, a former settlement in the Municipality of Kočevje, Slovenia
 Kočevski Rog or simply Rog, a plateau in Slovenia
 Loch Ròg, a loch on the west coast of Lewis, Outer Hebrides

Transportation
 Rail Operations Group, British rolling stock movement and train operating company
 Róg railway station, Róg, Pomeranian Voivodeship, Poland
 Rogart railway station, Scotland; National Rail station code ROG
 ROG, IATA airport code and FAA location identifier for Rogers Municipal Airport, Arkansas, United States

Other uses
 Rog (factory), a former bicycle factory, now a squat, in Ljubljana, Slovenia
 Reactive Organic Gases
 Republic of Gamers, Asus's line of gaming PC enthusiast components
 ROG Phone, Asus' gaming enthusiast smartphone
 Roog or Rog, the supreme deity in the Serer religion
 Royal Observatory, Greenwich
 The Northern dialect of the Roglai language of Vietnam (ISO 639-3: rog)

See also
 Roog (disambiguation)
 Roger
 Republic of Ghana
 Republic of Guinea
 German Republic (disambiguation)